SS Viking may refer to:

Ships
 , a sailing ship
 , a steamship
 Empire Viking, several Empire Ships named Viking, see List of Empire ships (U–Z)
 SS Viking I, see List of Empire ships (U–Z)
 SS Viking II, see List of Empire ships (U–Z)
 SS Viking III, see List of Empire ships (U–Z)
 SS Viking IV, see List of Empire ships (U–Z)
 SS Viking VIII, see List of Empire ships (U–Z)
 SS Viking IX, see List of Empire ships (U–Z)
 SS Viking X, see List of Empire ships (U–Z)

Other uses
 5th SS Panzer Division Wiking, WWII Waffen-SS Nazi tank division "Viking", composed of Scandinavian volunteers

See also
 Viking (disambiguation)
 Wiking (disambiguation)